William Bernard Conway (1802–1839) was an American politician and newspaperman who was the first secretary and first acting governor of Iowa Territory.

Conway was born in New Castle County, Delaware. In Pittsburgh, Pennsylvania in 1830, he started publishing The American Manufacturer, a newspaper supportive of the Democratic Party. In 1833, he was admitted to the Pennsylvania bar and opened a law practice, which he relocated from Pittsburgh to Johnstown, Pennsylvania in 1835. While in Johnstown he founded a newspaper called the Mountaineer in early 1836; later in the same year he moved its publication to Ebensburg, Pennsylvania.

In 1838, he was appointed Secretary of the Iowa Territory by President Martin Van Buren. Conway had never before held a political office; his appointment was said to have been in reward for his journalistic support of Van Buren and his predecessor Andrew Jackson. Conway served briefly as acting governor of the territory until the arrival of the official governor Robert Lucas. Lucas saw Conway's assumption of this role as illegitimate, and upon arrival reversed Conway's gubernatorial actions except for the judicial districting of the territory. Conway is credited with designing the Iowa territorial seal, which served as the model for the seal of the University of Iowa.

Conway died in Burlington, Iowa Territory while in office in 1839. His remains were brought to Davenport for interment.

He was the writer of a poem, "Bribed Legislator", and a novel, The Cottage on the Cliff: A Tale of the Revolution.

References

Editors of Pennsylvania newspapers
Governors of Iowa Territory
Pennsylvania Jacksonians
19th-century American politicians
People from New Castle County, Delaware
Politicians from Pittsburgh
Writers from Delaware
Writers from Iowa
Writers from Pittsburgh
1802 births
1839 deaths
19th-century American newspaper editors
American male journalists
19th-century American newspaper founders
Journalists from South Dakota
Journalists from North Dakota
Journalists from Pennsylvania
Lawyers from Pittsburgh